Team Zenko Go is a preschool computer animated children's streaming television series produced by DreamWorks Animation Television and Mainframe Studios. Based on the "Dojo Daycare" books by Chris Tougas and developed by Jack Thomas for Netflix, the series premiered on March 15, 2022. A second season was released on August 8, 2022.

Synopsis
The series follows the exploits of the titular team, a group of 4 specially-trained kids who go around making "Zenkos" (Japanese for "good deed") in secret around their hometown of Harmony Harbor, assisted by their mentor, Auntie Yuki, and Ponzu, her pet flying squirrel.

Voice cast

Main
 Hartley Bernier as Ari, the newest member of the team. Ari recently moved into Harmony Harbor in the series premiere and helps his mom in running a comic book shop where they live. He is focused and brilliant, having been able to discover the team whereas everyone else has failed to notice. Ari uses a wheelchair and invents numerous gadgets for the team to use, most notably, an extending robotic arm called the grabinator. His suit color is orange.
 Penelope Good as Ellie, one of the team's senior members. Ellie is artistic and dramatic, though she can seem snobbish at times. Because of her creative abilities, she is very acrobatic and very skilled at jumping. She can also flawlessly impersonate a person's voice, often helping the team stay hidden. Her suit color is sky blue.
 Dominic Mariche as Jax, one of the team's senior members. Jax is assertive but can overthink at times, even forgetting numerous tidbits. While Jax shares his teammates' agility and stealth skills, he is most notable for carrying a notebook containing facts about every person in town (constantly updated), giving the team some insight into their current case. His suit color is red.
 Nakai Takawira as Niah, one of the team's senior members. Niah loves being out in nature and is a contributing member to the community garden, in addition to many other memberships throughout town. She is an expert on the natural world and is capable of imitating bird calls. Her suit color is purple, and she is the only African-American member of the main cast.
 D'arcy Han as Auntie Yuki, the mentor of the team and the owner of a noodle truck in Harmony Harbor. Yuki gives advice that can occasionally seem vague, but she is always up to help when needed. She is a bit eccentric and tends to argue with Ponzu, but her assistance is often invaluable to the team.
 Tabitha St. Germain as Ponzu, a northern flying squirrel and Auntie Yuki's pet and assistant. Ponzu is typically bratty and lazy, often causing as many problems as he tries to help the team solve. He is capable of numerous feats, including his species' signature gliding ability, but that is tempered by his immense appetite.
 Germain also voices Rona, Fawna, and Donna Dunsmore, three adult triplets. Donna runs her own delivery company and has named her truck Phyllis, while Rona is a socialite who works on putting Harmony Harbor on the map. Fawna, however, is generally seen in the community garden and often helps with wildlife and other animal-related matters.

Supporting
 Hiro Kanagawa as Mr. Tanaka, an elderly bespectacled man who works at the community center. Tanaka is one of the nicest people in Harmony Harbor's community, and later becomes Scruffy's owner in late season 1.
 Abigail Journey Oliver as Lula LaBlanc, a young girl who hangs around the team in their off time and is one of their most frequent Zenko subjects. Lula owns a pet snake and is known to be very energetic, meaning that she gets along well with the rest of the team.
 Rebecca Shoichet as Kat, Ari's easily-distracted mother and the owner of their comic book store. She shares her son's basic personality, though despite how their relation to each other would suggest, Ari is the more responsible one of the pair.
 Chance Hurstfield as Rodney J. Dinkle, an arrogant teen boy who believes himself to be the best around... despite being several flawed in several areas, though the team always helps him if he needs it. Rodney always causes trouble for the team due to his misplaced sense of class and lack of common sense or fairness, though they care for him all the same.
 Mark Christian Heywood as Ian, Niah's uncle and the most athletic man in Harmony Harbor.
 Gordon Cormier as Luis, a young boy and Gabriel's younger brother who is easily distracted.
 Vania Gill as Felicia, a girl who like thing fashion and adorable. And Friends of Luis and Gabriel.

Minor
 Jaden Oehr as Henry, a young boy who hangs around with Lula.
 Micah Chan as Theo, a young boy who hangs around with Lula.
 Kaitlyn Vott as Sam Ochoa, a teenage girl who is always willing to help around town. She is often seen at the skate park and is an expert skateboarder.
 Madeleine Hirvonen as Maria, a young girl and aspiring artist who is a good friend of Ellie's.
 Josh Zaharia as Gabriel, a teenage boy and Luis's older brother.
 Michael Dobson as Ken Kablam, a famous comic book author known for his series "The Squasher."

Animals
Scruffy, a hyperactive dog belonging to Mr. Tanaka. He resembles a mix between a terrier and a greyhound.
Yolanda, a pigeon in Harmony Harbor who is disliked by the team for how often she interferes with a Zenko.
Whiskers, a San Francisco garter snake belonging to Lula.
Glitzy, a poodle owned by Rona Dunsmore.

Episodes

Season 1 (2022)

Season 2 (2022)

Release
Team Zenko Go was globally released on March 15, 2022, on Netflix. A trailer was released on February 17, 2022. Originally slated for a July 11 release, a second season released on August 8, 2022.

Notes

References

External links

2022 American television series debuts
2020s American animated television series
2020s American children's television series
2020s preschool education television series
American children's animated comedy television series
American children's animated superhero television series
American computer-animated television series
American preschool education television series
Animated preschool education television series
Animated television series about children
Children's books adapted into television shows
English-language Netflix original programming
Netflix children's programming
Superhero television series
Television series by DreamWorks Animation